The Bell and the Hammer, is the third album released by This Day and Age on its label One Eleven Records.

Track listing
 Always Straight Ahead - 5:10
 Second Star to the Right - 4:48
 The Bell and the Hammer - 5:13
 More of a Climb, Less of a Walk - 6:33
 Sara, Poor Sara - 4:46
 Eustace - 4:39
 Walking Contradictions - 4:44
 Building a Home - 4:27
 Winter Winter Spring - 3:46
 Practice Makes Better - 4:06
 Of Course We've All Seen the Sun - 4:40
 All We Thought We Could - 5:34

2004 albums